Idiophantis lomatographa is a moth of the family Gelechiidae. It was described by John David Bradley in 1962. It is found on Vanuatu in the South Pacific.

References

Moths described in 1962
Idiophantis